Biofield may refer to:

Alternative medicine
Energy (esotericism), biopsychospiritual energy 
 Aura (paranormal)
 Prana
 Qi
 Vital energy
 Energy medicine, alternative, complementary or integrative medicine
 Energy field disturbance
 Ionized jewelry
 Magnet therapy
 Negative air ionization therapy
 Qigong
 Radionics
 Reiki

Medicine
 Electrophysiology, scientific study of electrical properties of cells and tissues
 Electroreception, sensory of electric fields by organisms
 Magnetoception, sensory of magnetic fields by organisms
 Bioelectromagnetics, scientific study of electric biofields of organisms
 Medical imaging, scientific magnetic or electrical biofield imaging
 Magnetoencephalography, brain imaging by magnetic field sensing
 Electroencephalography, brain imaging by electric field sensing
 Magnetocardiography, heart imaging by sensing its magnetic field
 Magnetogastrography, stomach imaging by sensing magnetic fields
 Magnetomyography, muscle imaging by sensing magnetic fields, produced by electrical impulses

Other uses
 BioFields (company), an algal fuel producer